Tadvai is a village and mandal headquarters in Jayashankar district, Telangana, India. Recently it changed its name into "Sammakka Saralamma Tadvai" .

Dolmen

There is a megalithic dolmen graves site in the forest near Tadvai which was identified And by the archaeology department.

Panchayats
There are 12 village panchayats in Tadvai mandal.
Bayyakkapet
Beerelli
Dameravai
Gangaram
Kalwapalli
Katapuram
Lingala
Narlapur
Narsapur
Oorattam
Pambapur
Tadvai

References

Villages in Jayashankar Bhupalpally district
Mandals in Jayashankar Bhupalpally district